The 1990 Supercopa Libertadores Finals was a two-legged football series to determine the winner of the 1990 Supercopa Libertadores, played in January 1991. The finals were contested by Paraguayan Club Olimpia and Uruguayan Club Nacional de Football.

In the first leg, held in Estadio  Centenario in Montevideo, Olimpia easily defeated Nacional 3–0. The second leg was held in Estadio Defensores del Chaco in Asunción, where both teams tied 3–3. Therefore Olimpia won the series 3–1 on points (6–3 on aggregate), achieving their first Supercopa Libertadores trophy.

Qualified teams

Venues

Match details

First leg

Second leg

References

1
s
s
Supercopa Libertadores Finals